Commission for Public Office and Elections is one of the standing commissions of the National Assembly. 

It is always the first body names, since it has to confirm mandates of the elected MPs during the first session of the Assembly.

Responsibilities 
Commission:

 confirms mandates of the MPs
 discusses issues relating to the immunity of deputies, judges of the Constitutional Court, judges and the Ombudsman and his deputies,
 informs the Assembly of cases which result in the termination of the MP's mandate,
 discusses draft laws and other regulations governing the status and rights of Members and the Secretary-General,
 address the issues regarding election, appointment and dismissal, when required by law,
 propose to the National Assembly in the appointment or election of officers,
 giving consent to the appointment of officers,
 adopts acts on salaries and other remuneration and reimbursement and leave Members and the Secretary-General.

Current members in the 8th National Assembly

References 

National Assembly (Slovenia)